Francis Chickering was an early settler of Dedham, Massachusetts who served in the Great and General Court of Massachusetts and on that town's Board of Selectmen for 15 years. He was also a teacher in the first public school in America, today well known as the Dedham Public Schools.

He arrived in Dedham in 1637 from Suffolk, England with his wife, Ann, and admitted as a freeman in 1640. Together they had Elizabeth in 1638, Bethia in 1640, and Mercy in 1648. He was possibly the brother of Henry Chickering, with whom he served in the General Court. He was a member of the Ancient and Honorable Artillery Company.

Chickering was a part owner of a mill on Mother Brook, the first man made canal in America. The Town was displeased with the "insufficient performance" of the mill under Nathaniel Whiting's management and so, in 1652, Whiting sold his mill and all his town rights to John Dwight, Chickering, Joshua Fisher, and John Morse for £250. Whiting purchased it back the following year, however.

Though the schoolhouse was still standing, in 1661 school was kept in Chickering's home. He signed the Dedham Covenant.

References

Works cited

 

Dedham, Massachusetts selectmen
Educators from Dedham, Massachusetts
Businesspeople from Dedham, Massachusetts
Members of the colonial Massachusetts General Court from Dedham
Ancient and Honorable Artillery Company of Massachusetts
English emigrants to British North America
Signers of the Dedham Covenant